Schrader is a family name very common roughly within the Triangle Hannover-Hamburg-Berlin within Germany (so-called "Eastfalia", part of today's states of Lower Saxony and Saxony-Anhalt). It means tailor. Carriers of this name have spread all over the world due to emigration from Germany. It is especially common in the United States, but there are also occurrences in France, Britain, and the Netherlands. Notable people with the surname include:

August Schrader (inventor) (1807–1894), inventor of "Schrader valve" for bicycle and auto tires 
Bernhard Schrader (1931–2012), German chemist, pioneer of Raman spectroscopy
Bertha Schrader (1845–1920), German painter, lithographer, and woodblock print-maker
Carl Voss-Schrader (1880–1955), Finnish colonel, business director, lawyer and short-term interior minister
Carol Schrader (born 1951), American TV presenter
Christian Schrader, American sound engineer
Clement Schrader (1820–1875), German Jesuit theologian
David Schrader (born 1952), American harpsichordist, organist, and fortepianist
Dicken Schrader (born 1973), Colombian-American video artist
Eberhard Schrader (1836–1908), German orientalist
Ed Schrader, American academic and university administrator
Friedrich Schrader (1865–1922), German-Ottoman translator, orientalist and writer
Gerhard Schrader (1903–1990), German chemist
Gus Schrader (1895–1941), American racecar driver
Heinrich Schrader (botanist) (1767–1836), German botanist
Heinrich Schrader (sportsman) (1893–1980), Australian footballer and cricketer
Hermann T. Schrader (1860–1934), Australian pianist, violinist and cellist
Hilde Schrader (1910–1966), German swimmer
Jim Schrader (1932–1972), American football player
Julius Schrader (1815–1900), German painter
Ken Schrader (born 1955), American racecar driver
Kurt Schrader (born 1951), American politician 
Leonard Schrader (1943–2006), American screenwriter and director 
Libbie Schrader, American musician 
Maria Schrader (born 1965), German actress
Otto Schrader (philologist) (1855–1919), German philologist
Otto von Schrader (1888–1945), German naval officer
Paul Schrader (born 1946), American film director
Warren Schrader (1921–2009), New Zealand flying ace of the Second World War

Fictional 
Hank Schrader, police officer in TV series Breaking Bad
Marie Schrader, character in TV series Breaking Bad

See also

References

Low German surnames
Occupational surnames